Thuy Diep is a Vietnamese-born American fashion designer.

Early life
As a child, under the influence of her parents who ran a tailoring school and custom-made clothing shop in her native home, Thuy began tailoring at an early age. She moved to the United States in 1981.

Education and career
Thuy's education was at Brown University and early professional career as a Pricewaterhouse consultant.  Returning to school, she attended Parsons The New School for Design.

After graduating from Parsons, Thuy held diverse jobs in the fashion industry.  With Nicolas Caito, a New York-based Parisian atelier, Thuy provided draping and patternmaking services for high-end designers including Carolina Herrera, Peter Som and Zac Posen. 

Following her work at Nicolas Caito, Thuy spent time at New York-based designer, United Bamboo, working throughout the design process..

In 2006, Thuy co-founded her eponymous women's fashion label THUY in New York City.

Thuy and Little Moony
In 2006, she formed her eponymous label "Thuy"., based in the SoHo neighborhood of lower Manhattan, producing women’s designer ready-to-wear clothing.. Thuy was critically acclaimed and showcased in New York Fashion Week.

In 2014, Thuy and her mom "Mama Xit" formed an eco-friendly children's label called Little Moony.  Designed in New York by Thuy, and made in Los Angeles by Mama Xit, the line is season neutral, is
www.littlemoony.com

References 

Living people
Vietnamese fashion designers
Vietnamese women fashion designers
Brown University alumni
1975 births
American fashion designers
American women fashion designers
American fashion businesspeople
Artists from New York City
Parsons School of Design alumni